Parallel is a geometric term of location which may refer to:

Computing
 Parallel algorithm
 Parallel computing
 Parallel metaheuristic
 Parallel (software), a UNIX utility for running programs in parallel
 Parallel Sysplex, a cluster of IBM mainframes
 Parallel communication
 Parallel port
 Parallel ATA
 Parallel Computers, Inc., an American computer manufacturer of the 1980s

Mathematics and science
 Parallel circuits, as opposed to series 
 Parallel (geometry)
Parallel (operator), mathematical function used in electrical engineering
 Parallel postulate
 Parallel evolution
 Parallel transport
Parallel manipulator

Navigation 
 Parallel (latitude), an imaginary east–west line circling a globe
 Parallel of declination, used in astronomy

Music and entertainment
 Parallel (manga)
 Parallel (2018 film), a Canadian science fiction thriller film
 Parallel (2023 film) an upcoming American science fiction thriller film
 Parallel key, the minor (or major) key of a major (or minor) key with the same tonic
 Parallel chord   
 Parallel (video), a compilation of music videos by REM
 Parallel (The Black Dog album), 1995
Parallel (Four Tet album)
 Parallel (EP), a  2017 EP by GFriend
 "The Parallel", an episode of the TV series The Twilight Zone

Other uses
 Parallel, a type of trench; see Siege#Age of gunpowder
 Parallel cousin
 Avinguda del Paral·lel
 Parallelism (grammar), a balance of two or more similar words, phrases, or clauses
 Parallelism (rhetoric)
 Parallel (filling stations operator), an operator in Ukraine's oil wholesale and retail markets
 Parallel lines (disambiguation)
 Parallel universe (disambiguation)
 Parallel World (disambiguation)

See also 
 Parallels (disambiguation)